Clever Mpoha is a well-known Zambian business executive who is the co-founder and Group Managing Director of Savenda Group a pan-African conglomerate. He founded the company in 1997.
He started with $1000 and grew it into a $300 million company. The company name reflects his philosophy and stands for SAVE Nations Develop Africa.

References

Living people
20th-century Zambian businesspeople
Year of birth missing (living people)
Place of birth missing (living people)